is a Japanese manga series written and illustrated by Shin-ichi Sakamoto, based on the Masakatsu Adachi book The Executioner Sanson. It was published in Shueisha's Weekly Young Jump from January 2013 to April 2015, and compiled into nine tankōbon volumes. A sequel, Innocent Rouge, was serialized in Grand Jump from May 2015 to January 2020, and compiled into twelve tankōbon volumes. Innocent story follows the Sanson family of executioners in France before the French Revolution, and centers around siblings Charles-Henri Sanson and Marie-Joseph Sanson.

Characters
Charles-Henri Sanson 
Marie-Joseph Sanson (younger sister of Charles-Henri Sanson)

Publication
Innocent is written and illustrated by Shin-ichi Sakamoto. The manga was serialized in Shueisha's Weekly Young Jump from January 31, 2013, to April 16, 2015.<ref></p></ref><ref></p></ref> Shueisha collected its chapters in nine tankōbon volumes, released from June 19, 2013, to May 19, 2015. During their Anime NYC 2022 panel, Dark Horse Comics announced that they licensed the manga and will release it in 3-in-1 omnibus volumes.

A sequel, Innocent Rouge was serialized in Shueisha's Grand Jump from May 20, 2015, to January 8, 2020.<ref></p><p></ref> Shueisha collected its chapters in twelve tankōbon released from October 19, 2015, to February 19, 2020.

Volume list

Innocent

Innocent Rouge

Reception 
In 2013, Innocent was one of the Jury Selections of the Manga Division at the 17th Japan Media Arts Festival Awards. In 2014, it was nominated for the 18th Tezuka Osamu Cultural Prize Reader Award. In 2015, it was nominated for the 8th Manga Taishō. Innocent Rouge received an Excellence Award at the 24th Japan Media Arts Festival in 2021.

References

External links
 

Dark Horse Comics titles
Historical anime and manga
Seinen manga
Shueisha franchises
Shueisha manga
Suspense anime and manga